Skalovo is a rural locality (a village) in Volosatovskoye Rural Settlement, Selivanovsky District, Vladimir Oblast, Russia. The population was 39 as of 2010.

Geography 
Skalovo is located 20 km west of Krasnaya Gorbatka (the district's administrative centre) by road. Matveyevka is the nearest rural locality.

References 

Rural localities in Selivanovsky District